The BNXT League Most Valuable Player award is given annually at the end of the regular season of the BNXT League, the highest professional basketball league in Belgium and the Netherlands, to the most valuable player of the league.

The award is the first tier MVP award in both the Dutch and Belgian system, replacing the Pro Basketball League MVP and DBL Most Valuable Player Award. The current award, given by the BNXT League, began when that league started, with the 2021–22 season.

BNXT League MVP winners (2022–present)

Player nationalities by national team:

References

External links
BNXT League - Official Site
BNXT League - Official Award Page
BNXT League at Eurobasket.com

Basketball most valuable player awards
European basketball awards
BNXT League basketball awards